Beinn Mheadhoin (739 m) is a mountain in the Northwest Highlands of Scotland. It is located in the Morvern area of Lochaber.

A peak of various ridges with a fine summit, it lies close to the settlement of Glensanda. A huge granite quarry has taken chunks out of its southern slopes.

References

Mountains and hills of the Northwest Highlands
Marilyns of Scotland
Grahams